Christopher Leone (born October 13, 1971) is a Los Angeles-based filmmaker with a background in visual effects and CG animation.

Biography
Leone wrote and directed the science-fiction film Parallels released by Fox Digital Studio on the Netflix streaming service in March 2015. Before that Leone directed two seasons of the digital series Suit Up and one season of Wolfpack of Reseda, also for Fox Digital.

Leone co-wrote and co-executive produced The Lost Room, a mini-series for Syfy produced by Lionsgate Television, starring Peter Krause, Julianna Margulies, and Kevin Pollak.  The Lost Room was created by Leone, Laura Harkcom, and Paul Workman and first aired in December 2006.  Leone, Harkcom, and Workman were nominated for a Writers Guild Award in 2008.

In 2006, Leone's short film K-7 screened at over 60 film festivals, including the Tribeca Film Festival and SXSW, and won 12 awards including Best Live Action Short at HBO's U.S. Comedy Arts Festival in Aspen, Best Short at CineVegas, and a Jury Mention at the Clermont-Ferrand International Short Film Festival.

In July 2009, Red 5 Comics published We Kill Monsters, written by Leone. He also directs commercials for Traction Avenue in downtown Los Angeles.

Filmography

Film

Television

References

External links
 
 
 

American television producers
American film directors
American male screenwriters
Living people
1971 births